Charles M. Schulz–Sonoma County Airport  is 7 miles (11 km) northwest of downtown Santa Rosa, California, in Sonoma County, California, United States.

The airport is named after Charles M. Schulz, the famed cartoonist of the Peanuts comic strip, who lived in Santa Rosa for more than 30 years. The airport's logo features Snoopy in World War I flying-ace attire atop his doghouse.

History

Military use
In the 1930s Santa Rosa had a small municipal airfield owned by Richfield Oil Corporation next to the Redwood Highway about 6 miles southeast of the present airport. Use of the 3,000-foot sod runway at the earlier airfield was discontinued during World War II as facilities at the present airport improved.

Opened in June 1942 and known as Santa Rosa Army Air Field, the airfield was assigned to Fourth Air Force as a group and replacement training airfield. Known units assigned to Santa Rosa were:

 354th Fighter Group, March–June 1943
 357th Fighter Group, June–August 1943
 363d Fighter Group, August–October 1943
 367th Fighter Group, October–December 1943

The 478th Fighter Group was permanently assigned to Santa Rosa in December 1943 and began training replacement pilots, who were sent to combat units overseas after graduation.

The airfield was inactivated on January 31, 1946 and turned over to the War Assets Administration for eventual conversion to a civil airport.

Airline flights
From the late-1940s to the mid-1970s Southwest Airways and successors Pacific Air Lines, Air West and Hughes Airwest served Santa Rosa. Southwest Airways Douglas DC-3s followed by Pacific, Air West and Hughes Airwest Fairchild F-27s mainly flew to San Francisco.

Commuter airlines flew STS to San Francisco (SFO) until 2001 as well as to San Jose (SJC) at various times. In 1969 Golden Pacific Airlines (1969-1973) was operating six roundtrip flights every weekday between the airport and SFO as well as direct flights to Eureka, Lake Tahoe, Reno, Stockton and Ukiah with Beechcraft 99 commuter turboprops  During the mid-1970s Eureka Aero was flying nonstop to Eureka and Sacramento. In 1985 Westates Airlines Convair CV-580 turboprops flew nonstop to Los Angeles for several months before ceasing operations; their July 1985 timetable listed 38 round trips a week between STS and LAX. Other turboprop flights included American Eagle Fairchild Swearingen Metroliners operated by Wings West Airlines for American Airlines nonstop to SFO and San Jose SJC. In late 1989 American Eagle had three Metros a day to SFO and four a day to SJC. In 1995 Reno Air Express was operating codeshare BAe Jetstream 31 nonstop service from Eureka/Arcata, Reno and San Jose flown by Mid Pacific Air on behalf of Reno Air.

In the mid-1980s United Airlines entered into a code sharing agreement with WestAir, a commuter airline that had previously served STS with Cessna 402s and de Havilland Canada DHC-6 Twin Otters to San Francisco. WestAir then began flying as United Express to SFO until 2001. Westair operated Embraer EMB-110 Bandeirante, Short 360, BAe Jetstream 31 and Embraer EMB-120 Brasilia turboprops.

In 1989 jet service arrived in Santa Rosa when WestAir operating as United Express began flying four weekday BAe 146-200 nonstops to Los Angeles, soon replaced with Embraer EMB-120 Brasilia turboprops with this service to LAX then ending in 1991. The Westair BAe 146s were Santa Rosa's only jet flights until Allegiant Air jets appeared on May 19, 2016 followed by American Eagle on February 16, 2017. WestAir formerly operated as Stol Air Commuter flying Britten-Norman Islanders and Trislanders to San Francisco. Stol Air Commuter had administrative offices in Santa Rosa. United Express left Santa Rosa in 2001 (and would not return until 2017) with the airport not having any scheduled passenger airline service for several years during the early and mid-2000s.

In March 2007 airline service resumed; Horizon Air, a subsidiary of Alaska Airlines, began flights to Seattle/Tacoma and Los Angeles operated with Bombardier Q400 propjets. Horizon then added flights to Portland, Oregon in late 2007, to Las Vegas in early 2008, and to San Diego in mid 2012.

In early 2011 Alaska Airlines announced it would retire its Horizon brand, and all flights operated by Horizon now use the Alaska Airlines name. In June 2012 the airline ended flights from STS to Las Vegas.

As part of an agreement between the airport, Alaska Airlines, and the local enotourism industry, it was announced in January 2012 that passengers were allowed to check a 12-bottle case of wine for free on all Alaska Airlines flights from the airport.

All Alaska Airlines flights from Santa Rosa are currently operated with 76-seat Embraer E175 regional jets. E-175s currently fly nonstop to Burbank, Los Angeles, Orange County, Portland, San Diego, and Seattle.

New jet service
In March 2016 Allegiant Air announced it would begin flying McDonnell Douglas MD-83s nonstop to Las Vegas McCarran International Airport and nonstop to Phoenix-Mesa Gateway Airport (IWA). The Las Vegas flight began on May 19, 2016 and the Phoenix flight several days later. At the time, the MD-83 was the largest airliner ever scheduled to Santa Rosa; as of October 19, 2016, Allegiant switched from the 166 seat MD-83 to the 155 seat Airbus A319. Allegiant ended flights to Phoenix-Mesa on January 2, 2017 and to Las Vegas on June 30, 2017 and no longer serves Santa Rosa.

In October 2016 American Airlines announced it would begin nonstop service between Santa Rosa and its hub in Phoenix (PHX) on February 16, 2017. The daily code share flight was being operated by SkyWest Airlines as American Eagle with Canadair CRJ-700s. American Eagle then added a second nonstop CRJ-700 roundtrip flight to Phoenix and currently operates  one Canadair CRJ-900 roundtrip flight per day between Phoenix and Santa Rosa. American Eagle announced it would begin flying Embraer 175s nonstop to Los Angeles (LAX) effective May 3, 2019 and nonstop to Dallas/Fort Worth (DFW) effective June 6, 2019. American Eagle currently operates nonstop jet flights to PHX and seasonally to DFW from Santa Rosa.

In February 2017 United Express announced their return to Santa Rosa with thrice daily service to the United Airlines hub in San Francisco (SFO). The flights began on June 8, 2017; SkyWest Airlines Canadair CRJ-200s operate the code sharing flights for United. United Express announced it would begin nonstop CRJ-200 regional jet flights to Denver on March 8, 2019 .  However, United Express is currently not operating any service from Santa Rosa.

In March 2017 Sun Country Airlines announced seasonal nonstop service between Santa Rosa and Minneapolis/St. Paul International Airport, to operate from late summer until late fall. Sun Country was operating weekly 162 seat Boeing 737-800s from August 24, 2017 through December 3, 2017, connecting via Minneapolis/St. Paul to Boston, New York John F. Kennedy Airport and Washington Reagan National Airport. Sun Country then continued to operate from the airport but had ended all service to Ronald Reagan Washington National Airport and was serving Washington Dulles Airport instead at the time. In May 2018 Sun Country Airlines made a surprise announcement that it would be adding a new seasonal destination from Santa Rosa with nonstop flights between STS and Las Vegas (LAS) in addition to its seasonal nonstop service between the airport and MSP. The Sun Country fleet is composed of Boeing 737-700s and 737-800s, which were the largest aircraft types serving the airport at the time. Sun Country left the airport in early 2020.

Avelo Airlines began nonstop service to the Hollywood Burbank Airport (BUR) in the Los Angeles area on April 28, 2021 and then subsequently added nonstop flights to Las Vegas with Boeing 737-800 mainline jetliners which are currently the largest aircraft type serving Santa Rosa in scheduled passenger service.  Alaska Airlines has since begun nonstop jet service from the airport to BUR as well.

With the retirement of all Bombardier Q400 turboprop aircraft from the Alaska Airlines fleet in late January 2023, all Alaska Airlines flights from Santa Rosa are currently operated with Embraer E175 regional jets.

Facilities
It has two asphalt runways: 02/20 is 5,202 by 100 feet (1,586 x 30 m) and 14/32 is 6,000 by 150 feet (1,829 x 46 m).

In 2017 the airport had 79,231 aircraft operations, average 217 per day: 83% general aviation, 10% air taxi, 6% airline and 1% military. Three hundred fifteen aircraft were then based at this airport: 85% single-engine, 12% multi-engine, 2% jet, and 1% helicopter.

In August 2013 the airport started a project to decouple the ends of the two runways and extend runway 14/32 by 885 feet, to 6000 feet and extend runway 02/20 by 200 feet, to 5202 feet. This project was scheduled for completion in November 2014.

The influx of new passengers in the late 2010s left existing airport facilities under severe strain. As a stopgap solution, the airport invested in a $4-million "tent" to serve as gate 2, which opened on October 22, 2021. This has allowed the airport to double the area for outbound passenger seating, open a second passenger screening lane with TSA Pre Check capabilities, and replace portable restrooms with permanent units.

As a more permanent solution, the airport has begun construction on an all-new terminal building. In the initial plan, the new terminal would add 19,000 square feet of new space at a cost of $20 million. However, as passenger growth surpassed projections, the project was expanded so that the new terminal would be 40,000 square feet (33,000 square feet of new space and 7,000 of renovated space) at a cost of $31 million. It will include a new gate 1 (replacing the old modular facility), additional space for concessions, an outdoor patio with seating and dining, a two new baggage claim systems, relocation of rental car desks, and a new ticketing lobby. Additionally, it will include space for two passenger screening lines, allowing them to be relocated from the gate 2 tent. The terminal broke ground in late 2020 and is scheduled to open in October 2022.

Ground transportation
The U.S. 101 freeway is accessible to the airport via Airport Boulevard. Both short-term and long-term parking is available. Long-term parking is split into two lots within walking distance to the north and southeast of the terminal.

The airport is served by Sonoma County Transit bus route 62. In addition, Mendocino Transit Authority routes 65 and 95 have limited pickups, and drop-offs by request. Sonoma County Airport Express buses also connect the airport with the Oakland International Airport and San Francisco International Airport.

Airlines and destinations

Passenger

Statistics

Other uses

Sonoma Air Attack Base
The Sonoma Air Attack Base of the California Department of Forestry and Fire Protection (known as CDF or CAL FIRE) was established in 1964 at the northeast corner of the airport. Sonoma responds to an average of 300 calls per year. It has a battalion chief and a fire captain (air tactics group supervisors), a fire apparatus engineer (base manager) and six firefighters. Aircraft at Sonoma include one OV-10 Bronco (Air Attack 140) and two Grumman S-2 Tracker air tankers (classified as S-2Ts, Tankers 85 and 86.)

Pacific Coast Air Museum
The Pacific Coast Air Museum is at the southeast corner of the airport, next to the hangar used in the 1963 Hollywood all-star comedy movie, It's a Mad, Mad, Mad, Mad World. Known as the Butler Building, the hangar was built during World War II and is still in use.

See also

 California World War II Army Airfields
 Wine tourism

References

External links
 
 Sonoma County Sheriff Helicopter Unit
 
 

1942 establishments in California
Airports established in 1942
Airfields of the United States Army Air Forces in California
Airports in Sonoma County, California
Charles M. Schulz
History of Santa Rosa, California
Transportation in Santa Rosa, California
Buildings and structures in Santa Rosa, California